Prenol, or 3-methyl-2-buten-1-ol, is a natural alcohol.  It is one of the most simple terpenoids.  It is a clear colorless oil that is reasonably soluble in water and miscible with most common organic solvents. It has a fruity odor and is used occasionally in perfumery.

Prenol occurs naturally in citrus fruits, cranberry, bilberry, currants, grapes, raspberry, blackberry, tomato, white bread, hop oil, coffee, arctic bramble, cloudberry and passion
fruit. It is also manufactured industrially by BASF (in Ludwigshafen, Germany) and by Kuraray (in Asia) as an intermediate to pharmaceuticals and aroma compounds. Global production in 2001 was between 6000 and 13,000 tons.

Industrial production
Prenol is produced industrially by the reaction of formaldehyde with isobutene, followed by the isomerization of the resulting isoprenol (3-methyl-3-buten-1-ol).

Polyprenols

Prenol is a building block of isoprenoid alcohols, which have the general formula:
H–[CH2CCH3=CHCH2]n–OH

The repeating C5H8 moiety in the brackets is called isoprene, and these compounds are sometimes called  'isoprenols'. They should not be confused with isoprenol, which is an isomer of prenol with a terminal double bond. The simplest isoprenoid alcohol is geraniol (n = 2): higher oligomers include farnesol (n = 3) and geranylgeraniol (n = 4).

When the isoprene unit attached to the alcohol is saturated, the compound is referred to as a dolichol.  Dolichols are important as glycosyl carriers in the synthesis of polysaccharides. They also play a major role in protecting cellular membranes, stabilising cell proteins and supporting the body's immune system.

Prenol is polymerized by dehydration reactions; when there are at least five isoprene units (n in the above formula is greater than or equal to five), the polymer is called a polyprenol. Polyprenols can contain up to 100 isoprene units (n = 100) linked end to end with the hydroxyl group (–OH) remaining at the end.  These long-chain isoprenoid alcohols are also called ‘terpenols’. They are important in the acylation of proteins, carotenoids, and fat-soluble vitamins A, E and K.

Polyprenols also play a vital role in cell metabolism. Research indicates that ingested polyprenols are metabolised by human and animal liver into dolichols which then take part in the dolichol phosphate cycle and are therefore easily assimilated by humans and animals. The pharmacological activity of polyprenols is based on their substitutive effect in the case of dolichol deficits which are observed with chronic inflammatory, degenerative and oncological diseases.

Live conifer needles are one of the richest and most widely available sources for polyprenol extraction in the world. Commercial extraction of polyprenols involves a soft extraction procedure that enables them to be extracted without destroying their biological activity.

Notes

References

External links

Flavors
Hemiterpenes
Alkenols